Abul Hasnat Khan (5 December 1946 - 30 April 2021) was an Indian politician belonging to the Communist Party of India (Marxist) (CPM).  He is a four-time MLA and two-time MP.

Early life
Son of Muslim Ali Khan and Dilafroze Khanam, Abul Hasnat Khan was born on 5 December 1946 at Dumka, then in Bihar. A post graduate degree holder in history. He was educated at the University of Calcutta and Rabindra Bharati University. He married Rokea Khanam in 1965, and they had two sons and three daughters.

Political career
Abul Hasnat Khan won from Farakka (Vidhan Sabha constituency) in 1977, 1982, 1987  and 1991.

He successfully contested from Jangipur (Lok Sabha constituency) in 1998 and 1999.

He took part in active politics from a young age and became a whole-time worker of CPI(M) in 1970.

Khan died from COVID-19 in 2021 at the age of 78.

References 

West Bengal MLAs 1977–1982
West Bengal MLAs 1982–1987
West Bengal MLAs 1987–1991
West Bengal MLAs 1991–1996
People from Murshidabad district
Lok Sabha members from West Bengal
Communist Party of India (Marxist) politicians from West Bengal
1946 births
2021 deaths
India MPs 1998–1999
India MPs 1999–2004
20th-century Bengalis
21st-century Bengalis
Deaths from the COVID-19 pandemic in India